WGVR-LP is an Oldies music radio station broadcasting from Gainesville, Florida as "Oldies 103.3" under the ownership of Radio Gainesville, INC. It previously broadcast an all 80's music format under the current name.

History
In 2014, the all new Z 103-3 launched with an all 1980s' hits format. On Monday March 19, 2018, the all new Oldies 103.3 launched with Scott Shannon's True Oldies Channel, while the previous '80s hits format moved to the 104.9 frequency and became "Y105", still having the same WYGC callsign.

References

Format Change Information: https://radioinsight.com/headlines/154297/80s-moving-gainesville-lpfm-wygc/

External links
 

GVR
Oldies radio stations in the United States